The Mr. Basketball of Arkansas award is awarded every year to the student-athlete chosen as the best individual high school basketball player in the state of Arkansas in the U.S. This award was earned by the best of the best in the state of Arkansas. Players who were leaders on and off the court, showed sportsmanship, and lead their team to victory in most occasions.

Award winners

Schools with multiple winners
The universities that have multiple award winners tend to be schools that are in, if not, close to the state of Arkansas. These schools are known to have a rich history of basketball in their state and the players that earned the award multiple times have either been drafted to the NBA, or played for a team in the NBA G-League. Oklahoma State University was the first-ever school to have achieved the NCAA championships in back-to-back years. In addition, the school has a total of 6 final four appearances throughout the history of the school, so as you can see Oklahoma State is a school with huge success in the basketball department. The University of Kentucky was known to be successful in the first few years of their career, but there were a couple of setbacks that the school experienced, like a couple of Kentucky players being involved in illegal activities that almost costed the coach his job. The University of Florida, like most of the SEC schools, were once thought of as a football college but eventually after making the NCAA tournaments 3 times in a row, the school soon received recognition as a prestigious basketball university winning multiple SEC championships.

Significance 
George Mikan was a big influence in this award being developed, being that he was the first "Mr. Basketball" player to ever win the award. His influence on the award gave away the idea for each state in the U.S. to be able to have their own Mr. Basketball award. States, for example like, Illinois, Alabama, and Maine who were able to have significant stories regarding the Mr. Basketball award winners in their state.

References 
 Schumacher, Michael. Mr. Basketball: George Mikan, the Minneapolis Lakers, and the Birth of the NBA. University of Minnesota Press, 2008. Open WorldCat, http://site.ebrary.com/id/10277748.

 Isaacsohn, Austin. Illinois’ Mr. Basketball, Charlie Moore Commits to Cal. ULOOP Inc., May,2016. https://www.dailycal.org/2016/05/18/charlie-moore-commits-to-cal-basketball/ [7]O'Brien, Chris (November 2018). https://www.alligator.org/sports/gators-trying-to-find-their-stroke-before-battle-atlantis/article_66f40400-e80f-11e8-a6db-278ebaf33f18.html. Gators trying to find their stroke before Battle 4 Atlantis

Mr. and Miss Basketball awards
Lists of people from Arkansas
Mr. Basketball of Arkansas